TVMás is the state-owned public broadcaster serving the Mexican state of Veracruz. It and Radiomás, a statewide radio network, are operated by the public agency Radiotelevisión de Veracruz, which is based in the state capital of Xalapa.

History
After receiving its permit on October 23, 1978, XHGV-TV channel 4 signed on January 6, 1980, with a formal inauguration by President José López Portillo. It was operated by the Secretariat of Education and Culture and was the first noncommercial regional television station in the country. It was known from the start as Canal 4 Más, owing to the analog station's plus offset. Initial programming focused on educational, informational and entertainment programs. The new station boasted a transmitter on Cerro de las Lajas and studios on Cerro de la Galaxia in the state capital of Xalapa.

It is the sister to the Radiomás state radio network, which was created in 2000.

The concession of XHGV-TDT expired without a properly filed renewal on December 31, 2021. A new concession for XHCPEO-TDT on the same channel was approved before the end of 2021, but due to technical adjustments and notification issues, the transmitter was temporarily shut down at the start of 2022.

Transmitters 
TVMÁS (XHGV-TDT) is distributed statewide by three additional repeater stations located throughout Veracruz:

|-

|-

|-

|}

Notes

XHGV, XHVCA, XHGVC (analog 21) and XHZOT became digital-only in December 2015. Four other stations, with transmitters at Huayacocotla, Ixhuatlán de Madero, Orizaba and San Andrés Tuxtla, were granted a one-year extension to remain in analog until 2016 and then had their concessions surrendered in August 2017, having never converted.

TVMÁS is also available continent-wide on SATMEX 6 C-band satellite (4068.5 MHz, V, 9.5 Mbit/s, DVB-S).

References 

Public television in Mexico
Television channels and stations established in 1999
Television stations in Veracruz
1999 establishments in Mexico